Argavieso may refer to:
 House of Argavieso, a Lordship in the former kingdom of Aragón, Spain
 Argavieso, Huesca, a municipality in the province of Huesca, Spain